Howard David Wendell (January 25, 1908 – August 11, 1975) was an American actor.

Wendell's Broadway credits include Make a Wish (1951), The Curious Savage (1950), Arms and the Man (1950), The Show Off (1950), and The Great Campaign (1947).

Between 1949 and 1970, Wendell made a number of film appearances but worked mostly on TV, in such programs as Dragnet, Perry Mason, Wagon Train, Gunsmoke, Bonanza, Batman (season 1, episodes 3 and 4), The Munsters, The Adventures of Ozzie & Harriet, Leave it to Beaver, The Dick Van Dyke Show, Hazel, and The Big Valley.  His final appearance was in Adam-12.

Filmography

References

External links

1908 births
1975 deaths
American male television actors
American male film actors
People from Johnstown, Pennsylvania
Male actors from Pennsylvania
20th-century American male actors